Edward Davis (February 27, 1911 – May 3, 1999) was an American car dealer.

Biography

Early life
Davis was born in Shreveport, Louisiana in 1911 and his family moved to the Detroit area in 1921.  He graduated from Cass Technical High School.

Career
After graduating from Cass Tech, Davis opened a car wash but would eventually find success in sales at a local Dodge dealership.   In 1938, he opened a used car lot and two years later became a Studebaker dealer.   Studebaker Corporation faced financial difficulties in the 1950s which led to Davis closing his dealership in 1956.  In 1963, he opened a Chrysler-Plymouth dealership which he ran until 1971.

Following his retirement from the car business, Davis accepted an appointment as general manager of the Detroit mass transit system from mayor Roman Gribbs.  During this time he also wrote his autobiography, One Man's Way, which was published in 1979.

In 1996, Davis became the first black inductee in the Automotive Hall of Fame.

References

1911 births
1999 deaths
American automobile salespeople
African-American businesspeople
African-American history in Detroit
Businesspeople from Detroit
People from Shreveport, Louisiana
20th-century American businesspeople
20th-century African-American people